Laksky District is an administrative and municipal district (raion), one of the forty-one in the Republic of Dagestan, Russia. It is located in the southern central part of the republic. Its administrative center is the rural locality (a selo) of Kumukh. As of the 2010 Census, the total population of the district was 12,161, with the population of Kumukh accounting for 15.9% of that number.

Administrative and municipal status
Within the framework of administrative divisions, Laksky District is one of the forty-one in the Republic of Dagestan. The district is divided into sixteen selsoviets which comprise fifty rural localities. As a municipal division, the district is incorporated as Laksky Municipal District. Its sixteen selsoviets are incorporated as nineteen rural settlements within the municipal district. The selo of Kumukh serves as the administrative center of both the administrative and municipal district.

Demographics
Laksky and Kulinsky Districts are the territory where the ethnic Laks predominantly live.

See also
History of the Lak people

References

Notes

Sources

Districts of Dagestan
Laks (Caucasus)